Liver pâté is a pâté and meat spread popular in Northern and Eastern Europe. Made from finely or coarsely ground pork liver and lard, it is similar to certain types of French and Belgian pâtés.

Scandinavia 
 
It is made from a mixture of pork liver, lard, onion, flour, egg, salt, pepper and spices, poured into a loaf pan and then baked in the oven. The liver is usually finely ground, but coarsely ground variations are also made. Typical spices includes allspice and some recipes also includes a small amount of cured anchovy. In Norway,  is made with a bit of pork meat. 

 is served with bread in a variety of ways. It is served both hot and cold and can be bought premade in supermarkets, butcher shops and delicatessens. 

A popular everyday version is to spread cold  on a slice of rugbrød (Danish dark wholemeal rye bread) and eat it as a simple open-faced sandwich. More extravagant variations include the smørrebrød known as Dyrlægens natmad. Swedes often use it on crispbread. It may be topped with a variety of accompaniments, such as pickled beets or cucumbers, raw onions, fried onions, fried bacon or slices of fresh cucumber. In Sweden, fresh cucumber and a bit of dill are sometimes used.

In Denmark,  was introduced in 1847 by the Frenchman François Louis Beauvais in Copenhagen. At that time it was considered a luxury dish, and was expensive. Today, it is a common and affordable food item. In two 1992 surveys, Danes ranked  as their favorite sandwich topping. Stryhn's is one of the main producers in Denmark with 85,000 units produced daily. The company was established in 1945 on the isle of Amager, east of Copenhagen. For the past few decades, their Stryhns brand has been the most popular  in Denmark. In Denmark,  is almost always sold in aluminium trays; this way it can go right in the oven to be served hot if preferred by the consumer.

See also

 Chopped liver
 Liverwurst
 Braunschweiger (sausage)
 Foie gras
 List of spreads
 Offal

References

Danish cuisine
Liver (food)
Spreads (food)
Swedish cuisine
Norwegian cuisine